Shimin may refer to:

Alexander Shimin (born 1970), Kazakhstani former ice hockey goaltender and coach
Fang Shimin, pen name Fang Zhouzi, Chinese science writer
Li Shimin, Emperor Taizong of Tang (598–649), second emperor of the Tang dynasty of China
Wang Shimin (1592–1680), Chinese landscape painter during the late Ming Dynasty and early Qing Dynasty
Yan Shimin (born 1987), Chinese rower

See also
The Prince of Qin, Li Shimin, 2005 Chinese television series
Shi Min (disambiguation)
Shiming
Shimmin
Simin (disambiguation)